Franklin Bolívar Tenorio Ramón (born June 30, 1969, in Salcedo, Cotopaxi) is an Ecuadorian long-distance and marathon runner. Tenorio represented Ecuador at two Olympic games, where he ran in the men's marathon, which was held annually on the last day of the competition. He finished the race in seventy-first place, with a time of 2:31:12, at the 2004 Summer Olympics in Athens, and in sixty-fifth place, with a time of 2:29:05, at the 2008 Summer Olympics in Beijing. He also achieved his personal best of 2:10:22 at the Rome Marathon in 1998.

References

External links
 
 NBC 2008 Olympics profile

1969 births
Living people
People from Salcedo Canton
Ecuadorian male marathon runners
Ecuadorian male long-distance runners
Olympic athletes of Ecuador
Athletes (track and field) at the 2004 Summer Olympics
Athletes (track and field) at the 2008 Summer Olympics
Pan American Games competitors for Ecuador
Athletes (track and field) at the 1999 Pan American Games
Athletes (track and field) at the 2011 Pan American Games
World Athletics Championships athletes for Ecuador
South American Games bronze medalists for Ecuador
South American Games medalists in athletics
Competitors at the 1998 South American Games